Magic Eight Ball may refer to:

 Magic 8-Ball, a toy
 Magic Eight Ball (band), a British band